The 1971 Football Championship of Ukrainian SSR was the 41st season of association football competition of the Ukrainian SSR, which was part of the Soviet Second League in Zone 1. It was the first season in the newly established Soviet Second League, after both Class A and Class B competitions were discontinued.

The season started on 3 April 1971.

The 1971 Football Championship of Ukrainian SSR was won by FC Kryvbas Kryvyi Rih.

Reorganization 
The division became a part of big football reform that took place in the Soviet Union and stretched over two years 1970–1971. Most of the club previously competed in the 1970 Class A Second Group (Zone 1) and were grandfathered into the newly established Second League (Zone 1). Clubs from other union republics (Belorussian SSR) were weeded out into other Zone. The lower tier Class B competition were completely disbanded with only eight teams allowed to advance to the Second League, thus replacing those club of other union republics.

Teams

Location map

Relegated teams 
 SKA Kiev – (returning after five seasons)

Promoted teams 
Eight clubs were promoted from the 1970 Class B (Ukrainian SSR).

 FC Khimik Severodonetsk
 FC Lokomotyv Vinnytsia
 FC Lokomotyv Donetsk
 FC Dynamo Khmelnytskyi
 FC Verkhovyna Uzhhorod
 FC Torpedo Lutsk
 FC Horyn Rovno
 FC Dnipro Cherkasy

Relocated and renamed teams 
 FC Azovets Zhdanov changed its name to FC Metalurh Zhdanov.
 FC Spartak Sumy changed its name to FC Frunzenets Sumy.
 FC Verkhovyna Uzhhorod changed its name to FC Hoverla Uzhhorod.

Final standings

Top goalscorers 
The following were the top goalscorers.

See also 
 Soviet Second League

Notes

References

External links 
 1971 season regulations. Luhansk football portal
 1971 Soviet Second League, Zone 1 (Ukrainian SSR football championship). Luhansk football portal
 1971 Soviet championships (all leagues) at helmsoccer.narod.ru
 Second League (Zone 1) – 1971 (Друга ліга (1 зона) - 1971). ukr-football.org

1971
3
Soviet
Soviet
football
Football Championship of the Ukrainian SSR